Lee-Anne Hunter (born 14 July 1964) is an Australian former cricketer who played as a right-handed batter and right-arm medium bowler. She appeared in two Test matches and 24 One Day Internationals for Australia between 1985 and 1996. She played domestic cricket for South Australia.

References

External links
 
 

Living people
1964 births
Cricketers from Adelaide
Australia women Test cricketers
Australia women One Day International cricketers
South Australian Scorpions cricketers